Bruce Roberts may refer to:

Bruce Roberts (actor), Australian television news presenter, also known for his former acting role as Nick Parrish on the soap opera Home and Away
Bruce Roberts (cricketer) (born 1962), former Zambian cricketer who played for Transvaal
Bruce Roberts (curler), American curler
Bruce Roberts (photographer), American news and portrait photographer
Bruce Roberts (runner) (born 1957), Canadian Olympic athlete
Bruce Roberts (singer), singer and songwriter
Bruce Roberts-Godson, Australian boat designer.